This is a list of large companies in the nuclear power industry that are active along the nuclear chain, from uranium mining, processing and enrichment, to the actual operating of nuclear power plant and nuclear waste processing.
There are many other companies that provide nuclear technologies such as nuclear medicine that are independent of the electrical power generation sector.

Others
Other notable nuclear power groups (some mixed energy) include:

See also
Nuclear power by country
:Category:Nuclear industry organizations
List of anti-nuclear power groups

References 

Energy conversion
Nuclear power
Nuclear power stations
Nuclear technology
Power station technology
Uranium mining
Nuclear fuels
companies in the nuclear sector
Nuclear industry